Lunars Comedy Express was an Indian popular Malayalam comedy reality-television competition, broadcast on the Malayalam channel Asianet and is sponsored by Britelite. Team Mamankam and Team Happy were declared as the winners of the series and were awarded 1.5 Million rupees.

Cast

Judges 
 Jagadish
 Rachana Narayanankutty
 Anoop Chandran
 Baburaj
 Siddique
 Menaka
 Kalabhavan Shajohn
 Ranjini
 Geetha Vijayan
 M. G. Sreekumar

Host 
 Shilpa Bala
 Meera

References 

Malayalam-language television shows
2012 Indian television series debuts
Indian game shows
Asianet (TV channel) original programming